Crampton's Gap, also known as Crampton Gap, is a wind gap on South Mountain in Maryland.

The  gap connects Burkittsville in the Middletown Valley to the east with Gapland and Rohrersville in the Pleasant Valley to the west.

Documentation of the earliest land tracts in the Crampton's Gap area and records related to the earliest road may be found in The Land Tracts of the Battlefield of South Mountain by Curtis L. Older.

The gap is the location of Gathland State Park and was the site of the Battle of Crampton's Gap on September 14, 1862, during the Maryland Campaign of the American Civil War.

References

External links 
topo map
Gathland State Park

Wind gaps of the United States
Landforms of Frederick County, Maryland
Landforms of Washington County, Maryland
South Mountain Range (Maryland−Pennsylvania)
Journey Through Hallowed Ground National Heritage Area
Valleys of Maryland